Anat Nir is an Israeli businessperson and LGBT rights activist.

Early life 
Nir was born in Ganei Yehuda into a tumultuous family. Her parents separated when she was eight years old and divorced ten years later. Nir and her two sisters and brothers were raised by their mother, psychologist and organizational consultant .

Career 

At the age of 20, Nir founded the first lesbian bar in Tel Aviv on Lilienblum Street. Nir is business partners with Dana Ziv. They founded the party brand, "Dana and Anat".

Nir produced the first gay pride parade in Beersheba. In 2008, Nir and Ziv founded and produced the film festival, Lethal Lesbian. In 2009, Nir was one of the leaders of the Tel Aviv municipality's campaign to increase LGBT tourism. She served on the city's LGBT Association to promote women's inclusion in gay pride events. Nir and Ziv organized the Tel Aviv Pride central stage and have served on the planning committee. In 2008, they were the first women to drive a float in the parade. By 2016, half of the floats were driven by women.

She identifies with the Meretz party.

Personal life 
Nir is bisexual and identifies with lesbian culture.

References 

Israeli LGBT businesspeople
Israeli bisexual people
Bisexual women
Bisexual businesspeople
Bisexual Jews
21st-century Israeli businesswomen
21st-century Israeli businesspeople
People from Central District (Israel)
Israeli women activists
Israeli LGBT rights activists
Year of birth missing (living people)
Living people
Women civil rights activists
21st-century LGBT people
Jewish women activists